Twelve concerti grossi, Op. 6, is a collection of twelve concerti written by Arcangelo Corelli probably in the 1680s but not prepared for publication until 1714. They are among the finest and first examples of concerti grossi: concertos for a concertino group (here a 1st violin, a 2nd violin and a cello) and a ripieno group of strings with continuo. Their publication – decades after their composition and after Italian composers had moved to favor the ritornello concerto form associated with Vivaldi – caused waves of concerto grosso writing in Germany and England, where in 1739 Georg Frideric Handel honored Corelli directly with his own “Opus 6” collection of twelve.

Details
The first eight are concerti da chiesa while the last four are concerti da camera.

No. 1 in D major

c. 12 minutes

No. 2 in F major

c. 10 minutes

No. 3 in C minor

c. 10 minutes

No. 4, in D major

c. 10 minutes

No. 5, in B major

c. 11 minutes

No. 6, in F major

c. 12 minutes

No. 7, in D major

c. 9 minutes

No. 8, in G minor

Also known as the Christmas Concerto as it was written for Christmas Eve and has a pastorale in the last movement.

c. 14 minutes

No. 9, in F major

c. 9 minutes

No. 10, in C major

c. 13 minutes

No. 11, in B major

c. 10 minutes

No. 12, in F major

c. 10 minutes

Length estimates are drawn from the recording by The English Concert.

Discography
Pavlo Beznosiuk (conductor and violin), The Avison Ensemble, 2 discs, Linn Records (2012)

See also
Publications by Friedrich Chrysander

External links

PDF scores for Corelli, Op. 6 concerti grossi
More on the Twelve Concerti Grossi

Corelli
Compositions by Arcangelo Corelli
1714 compositions